Ahmanson's sportive lemur (Lepilemur ahmansonorum), or the Tsiombikibo sportive lemur, is a sportive lemur endemic to Madagascar. Wright's sportive lemur is found in western Madagascar, living in dry forests .

The species was originally named L. ahmansoni, but the name was found to be incorrectly formed and was corrected to L. ahmansonorum in 2009.

References

Sportive lemurs
Mammals described in 2006
Taxobox binomials not recognized by IUCN